Luteru Laulala (born 30 May 1995) is a New Zealand rugby union player who currently plays for  in New Zealand's domestic Mitre 10 Cup.   He is a utility back who is capable of playing as a first five-eighth, fullback or wing.

Senior career

Laulala debuted for  during the 2014 ITM Cup and made four appearances in total, one of which was from the start.   He joined Counties Manukau in 2016 along with older brother, All Blacks international, Nepo.   While his brother missed the entire campaign through injury, Luteru played all 11 games, scoring 3 tries and netting 4 conversions as the Steelers reached the Premiership Semi-Finals before going down to Canterbury.

International

Laulala was a New Zealand Schools Barbarians representative in 2012.   He was later a member of the Samoa Under 20 side which competed in the 2014 IRB Junior World Championship in New Zealand, before switching his allegiance back to the country of his birth, New Zealand ahead of the 2015 edition of the tournament.

References

1995 births
Living people
New Zealand rugby union players
People educated at Wesley College, Auckland
Rugby union fly-halves
Rugby union fullbacks
Rugby union wings
Counties Manukau rugby union players
Canterbury rugby union players
New Zealand sportspeople of Samoan descent
Rugby union players from Christchurch
Chiefs (rugby union) players
Urayasu D-Rocks players
Toyota Industries Shuttles Aichi players
Yokohama Canon Eagles players